Scrotal nerves may refer to:

 Anterior scrotal nerves
 Posterior scrotal nerves